Vicente Blanco (born 15 March 1884 in Deusto – 24 May 1957 in Bilbao) was a Spanish racing cyclist. He won the Spanish National Road Race Championships in 1908 and 1909.

Palmarès

1908
 National Road Race Champion
1909
 National Road Race Champion
1910
 National Stayer Champion
1st Donostia-Tolosa-Donostia
1st Somorrostro
1st Ortuella
1911
3rd Volta a Catalunya
1st Bilbao Bilbao-Erletxeta
1st Somorrostro
Champion Vasconavarro (Copa Comet)
1st Areatza
Champion Basconavarrès (Copa Comet)
1st Carrera Alcyon
1st Vitoria
1912
1st Las Arenas-Plentzia-Las Arenas
1st Eibar
1st Deusto
1st Mondragon-Arrasate (San Juan)

References

1884 births
1957 deaths
Spanish male cyclists
People from Greater Bilbao
Sportspeople from Biscay
Cyclists from the Basque Country (autonomous community)